Japlin bin Akim is a Malaysian politician who served as the State Assistant Minister. He served as the Member of Sabah State Legislative Assembly (MLA) for Usukan from May 2018 until September 2020. He is a member of the Malaysian United Indigenous Party (BERSATU) which is aligned with the ruling Perikatan Nasional (PN) coalition both in federal and state levels.

Election results

References

Members of the Sabah State Legislative Assembly
Malaysian United Indigenous Party politicians
Living people
Year of birth missing (living people)